Martina Michels (born 1 December 1955) is a German politician and Member of the European Parliament (MEP) from Germany. She is a member of The Left, part of the European United Left–Nordic Green Left.

Parliamentary service
Member, Committee on Regional Development
Member, Delegation for relations with Israel
Member, Committee on Culture and Education (2013)
Vice-Chair, Committee on Culture and Education (2013)

References

1955 births
Living people
MEPs for Germany 2009–2014
MEPs for Germany 2014–2019
MEPs for Germany 2019–2024
21st-century women MEPs for Germany
The Left (Germany) MEPs